John Lockwood (born about 1555; executed at York, 13 April 1642) was an English Roman Catholic priest. He is a Catholic martyr, beatified in 1929.

Life

He was the eldest son of Christopher Lockwood, of Sowerby, Yorkshire, by Clare, eldest daughter of Christopher Lascelles, of Sowerby and Brackenborough Castle, Yorkshire. With the second son, Francis, he arrived at Reims on 4 November 1579, and was sent to Douai College to study philosophy.

Francis was ordained in 1587, but John entered the English College, Rome, on 4 October 1595,and was ordained priest on 26 January 1597. He was  sent on the English mission, 20 April 1598.

After suffering imprisonment he was banished in 1610, but returned to work until he was finally captured again 32 years later in 1642 and arrested at Wood End, Gatenby, the residence of Bridget Gatenby. Now 87 years of age, he was hanged, drawn, and quartered at York with Blessed Edmund Catherick.

See also
 Catholic Church in the United Kingdom
 Douai Martyrs

References

Attribution
 The entry cites:
Joseph Gillow, Bibl. Dict. Eng. Cath., s. v.; 
Richard Challoner, Memoirs of Missionary Priests, II, No. 168; 
Thomas Francis Knox, Diaries of the English College, Douay (London, 1878), 157; 
Joseph Foster, Visitation of Yorkshire (London, privately printed, 1875), 61, 549; 
Catholic Record Society's Publications (London, privately printed, 1905, etc.), V, 384.

1555 births
1642 deaths
English beatified people
17th-century venerated Christians
16th-century English Roman Catholic priests
17th-century English Roman Catholic priests
One Hundred and Seven Martyrs of England and Wales